Euclid Aklana Wilson (born 13 November 1961) is an English former professional footballer who played in midfield and at left-back. 

He notably played top flight football for Manchester City, Chelsea, Queens Park Rangers and Tottenham Hotspur, with appearances for QPR and Spurs coming in the Premier League. He also played in the Football League with Chester City and Cambridge United.

After his playing career ended, he became a supply teacher at Davenant Foundation School in Loughton, Essex. He now teaches Physical Education at Roding Valley High School in Loughton. He was also a Physical Education teacher at St. Johns secondary school in Epping.

Playing career

Manchester City
Wilson was a member of the Manchester City youth team which lost to Aston Villa in the 1980 FA Youth Cup Final. He made his first team debut in a League Cup tie against Stoke City in October 1981. After a productive spell on loan at Chester produced more than 20 league appearances, Wilson's subsequent appearances were infrequent until the 1984/85 season which saw him win a regular place on the left side of midfield.

Upon Paul Power's departure for Everton in 1986 Wilson reverted to the number three shirt for the 1986/87 first division campaign.

Chelsea
After City's relegation Wilson signed for Chelsea, where he played regularly on the left of midfield before moving on to Queens Park Rangers in 1990.

Queens Park Rangers
Wilson made his QPR debut against Nottingham Forest in a 1–1 draw at the City Ground in August 1990. He was signed as a midfielder for QPR but the following season the new QPR boss, Gerry Francis, switched him to play left-back. It was here that Wilson truly found his position as his speed allied to his excellent passing ability made him an excellent defender. Over the next four seasons he was a near ever-present for Rangers and he went on to play 172 league games for the R's, scoring 12 goals, all bar one scored from the penalty spot.

Tottenham Hotspur
In the summer of 1995 he was allowed to leave on a free transfer and he joined Tottenham Hotspur (signed by his ex QPR boss Gerry Francis) where he turned out for another four seasons, despite being in the twilight of his career. He scored once in the league for Tottenham against Leicester City in September 1996, and once in the FA Cup against Wolverhampton Wanderers in January 1996. He made just one appearance in his final season at Spurs (1998–99), against Liverpool in the League Cup.

Cambridge United
He left Spurs in 1999 and played one more season for Cambridge United, ensuring their survival in Division Two a season after promotion, before retiring.

Personal life
He was named after the famous scientist Euclid by his father. He chose to use the name Clive however in later life.

His younger brother, Gus Wilson, was also a professional footballer who started as a trainee at Manchester City.
His daughter, Siobhan Wilson, played collegiate in the United States for Georgia State University and has also played professionally for Málaga and Sassuolo.

In 2009, Clive started teaching at Davenant Foundation School in Loughton, Essex, and now teaches at Roding Valley High School, Loughton, Essex. As well as teaching Physical Education, he also substitutes for subjects such as English, Maths, History and Geography. 

Clive has spent some time coaching at Chigwell based football club, Colebrook Royals FC.

References

External links 

 

1961 births
Manchester City F.C. players
Chester City F.C. players
Chelsea F.C. players
Queens Park Rangers F.C. players
Tottenham Hotspur F.C. players
Cambridge United F.C. players
Living people
Association football defenders
Footballers from Manchester
English footballers
Premier League players
English Football League players